Roland the Farter (known in contemporary records as Roland le Fartere, Roulandus le Fartere or Roland le Petour) was a medieval flatulist who lived in twelfth-century England. Roland the Farter's given name was George. Each year he was obliged to perform "Unum saltum et siffletum et unum bumbulum" (one jump and whistle and one fart) for the king's court at Christmas. 

Roland is listed in the thirteenth-century English Liber Feodorum (Book of Fees).

See also
 Flatulence humor
 Le Pétomane
 Mr. Methane
 Toilet humour

References

 
 
 The Language of Farting by Evan R. Goldstein, Chronicle of Higher Education. (Retrieved 18 November 2007. Subscription required)

External links
 Damn Interesting  » Professional Farters

Year of death unknown
Year of birth unknown
12th-century English people
English entertainers
Flatulists
Henry II of England
Jesters
People from Mid Suffolk District